The 2013–14 Rhode Island Rams basketball team represented the University of Rhode Island during the 2013–14 NCAA Division I men's basketball season. The Rams, led by second year head coach Dan Hurley, played their home games at the Ryan Center and are members of the Atlantic 10 Conference. They finished the season 14–18, 5–11 in A-10 play to finish in a tie for tenth place. They lost in the second round of the A-10 tournament to Massachusetts.

Roster

Schedule

|-
!colspan=9 style="background:#75B2DD; color:#002b7f;"| Exhibition

|-
!colspan=9 style="background:#75B2DD; color:#002b7f;"| Regular season

|-
!colspan=9 style="background:#75B2DD; color:#002b7f;"| Atlantic 10 tournament

References

Rhode Island Rams men's basketball seasons
Rhode Island